The climate of Romania is temperate continental transitioning into an oceanic climate on the eastern coast, influenced by Scandinavian-Baltic weather, the Mediterranean and the Black Sea. Thus, in the south, there are some influences of a mediterranean climate, characterized by mild winters and stronger rainfalls in the cooler months (especially in autumn). In the south-east, the Black Sea induces rare heavy strong rains.
In eastern regions the continental character is less pronounced. In the north of the country (Maramureș and Bukovina), the effect of the Scandinavian-Baltic climate is felt, effecting a wetter and colder climate with cold winters. The west of the country has a more pronounced influence of low pressure systems generated over the Atlantic, causing moderate temperatures and stronger precipitation.
Climate nuances are demonstrated on the steps of the altitude, the mountain ranges of the Carpathian arc have a cool mountain climate with high humidity throughout the year.

Rainfall, although adequate throughout the country, decreases from west to east and from mountains to plains.

Owing to its distance from the open ocean, Romania has a continental climate.

In the coldest months of winter (December and January) temperatures average between 3˚C and -15˚C. During winter, the skies are often cloudy and snowfall is quite common. In the plains of Romania there are about thirty days with snowfall per year.

Precipitation is generally modest, averaging over  only on the highest west-facing mountain slopes – much of it falling as snow which allows for an extensive skiing industry.

Records

Averages and records by city

See also 
 Climate

References

 
Geography of Romania
Romania